Stara Wieś  is a former village in the administrative district of Gmina Siennica, within Mińsk County, Masovian Voivodeship, in east-central Poland. In 2009 it was incorporated into Siennica village.

References

Villages in Mińsk County